Ming–Mong Mao War may refer to:

Ming–Mong Mao War (1386–1388)
Dao Ganmeng rebellion (1397–1398)
Luchuan–Pingmian campaigns (1436–1449)